Panayadikuppam otherwise known as Panaiyadikuppam or Panaiyadikkuppamis is a village in Bahour Commune of Bahour taluk  in the Union Territory of Puducherry, India. It lies on the north part of Karaiyamputhur Enclave of Puducherry. Panayadikuppam serves as a gateway to Nettapakkam from Bahour. Panayadikuppam is a part of Karaiyamputhur Village Panchayat.

Gallery

References

External links
Official website of the Government of the Union Territory of Puducherry

Villages in Puducherry district